Jarunee Suksawat (born February 12, 1962), also known by her French name Caroline Desneiges, is a Thai actress and businesswoman. She has been called "Action Queen of Thailand" and is best known for her hundreds of appearances in action movies in the 1970s and 80s.

Early life and education
Suksawat was born to a Thai mother, Rabiab Suksawat, and a French father, Ferdinand Desneiges, who abandoned her since she was at a young age. Her grandmother helped raising Suksawat as a single mother in low-income housing.
Suksawat attended Bang Kapi School, followed by a vocational course at Chao Phraya Commercial, and finally receiving a Bachelor's degree in Social Science from Suan Sunandha Rajabhat University and a Master's degree in Cosmetical Sciences from Mae Fah Luang University in Chiang Rai, Thailand.

Suksawat did not meet her father until 2000, shortly before his death.

Acting career
Suksawat starred in hundreds of films and was known as the "action movie queen", although she had no training in martial arts. She began acting in films in 1977, first in Sawasdee Khun Kroo and then in Rak Laew Raw Noi with popular actor Sorapong Chatree. She was a protégé of director Promsin Sibunruang.

In 1980, she starred in the drama film Baan Sai Thong, directed by Ruj Ronnapop and later in the sequel Pojjaman Sawangwong, seen as a breakthrough role. Before that, she said was typecast as a tomboy.

She left acting in the mid 1980s after being injured while filming, but occasionally returns to acting, including in the 2008 film Queens of Langkasuka directed by Nonzee Nimibutr, her first role in ten years. She had turned down a number of previous offers and found it difficult to return to filming.

Awards
In 2013, she received the Lotus Award for lifetime achievement from the World Film Festival of Bangkok.
 Golden Star 1980
 Popular Vote
 Mekhala Queen of Thai Film 2014

Business career
Suksawat runs an alternative health and beauty products company, Thaidham Alliance. She was on the steering committee of the 2011 conference of the International Federation of Societies of Cosmetic Chemists.

References

External links

1962 births
Living people
Jarunee Suksawat
Jarunee Suksawat
Jarunee Suksawat
Place of birth missing (living people)
Jarunee Suksawat
Jarunee Suksawat